The 1952 Winter Olympics were held in and around Oslo, Norway, from 14 to 25 February 1952. Ten competition and eight non-competition venues were used, in addition to three designated, but unused, reserve competition venues. Six of the competition venues were located in Oslo, while one each was located in Bærum, Skedsmo, Drammen and Krødsherad. Bislett stadion was the centerpiece of the games, hosting the opening and closing ceremonies, the speed skating and the figure skating. Two reserve venues were designated for the skating events, Tryvann stadion in Oslo and Hamar stadion in Hamar.

Jordal Amfi, an outdoor artificial ice rink, was built with a capacity for 10,000 spectators. This allowed ice hockey to be played on artificial ice for the first time at the Olympics. Of the tournament's 36 matches, 23 were played at Jordal, while the remaining were played at Kadettangen in Bærum, Dælenenga idrettspark in Oslo, Lillestrøm stadion in Skedsmo and Marienlyst stadion in Drammen.

The ski jumping, cross-country skiing and Nordic combined events were held at Holmenkollbakken,  from the city center. Stands were erected to seat 13,000 people, with capacity for an additional 130,000 standing spectators at the base of the hill. Cross-country races started and ended at the base of the ski hill. A switchboard was posted at the start and finish lines to help spectators monitor the progress of the competitors during the races. Most of the stands built for the ski jumping competition had to be removed for the cross-country races. As a result, there was little room for spectators to sit and watch the cross-country events. Spectators were therefore allowed to walk within the course.

The alpine skiing events were split between Rødkleiva, located in Oslo near Holmenkollen, and Norefjell, located at Krødsherad,  from Oslo and the only venue outside Greater Oslo. Downhill and giant slalom, the latter of which was making its Olympic debut, were competed at Norefjell. Considerable construction and upgrades were made to the area to make it suitable for Olympic competition. A bridge was built across the lake of Krøderen to help with transportation concerns; a new hotel, two ski lifts, and a new road were also constructed.

There was no permanent bobsleigh run in Norway as there was very little interest in the sport. The organizers decided to build a temporary course, Korketrekkeren, out of snow, which ran down the hill from Frognerseteren, near Holmenkollen. The run was built and tested in 1951, and was rebuilt in 1952 in time for the Olympics.

Competition venues

The following list contains the ten venues used for competitions during the 1952 Winter Olympics. They are listed by their name, as well as containing the sports held at the venue, the municipality where they are located and the spectator capacity.

Reserve venues

Three reserve venues were designated, should the weather not make it possible to hold events in Oslo. The following list contains the venue, the municipality they are located in, and the events for which they were designated.

Non-competition venues

The following is a list of the eight non-competition venues for the Olympics. This includes the name of the venue, the municipality in which it is located and its purpose.

Post-Olympic use
Bislett remained a speed skating venue until 1988, after which it only hosted athletics and football. Between 1925 and 1986, it saw 13 world championships and 10 European championships in speed skating. The structure was demolished and replaced with a new stadium in 2005. It hosts the annual Bislett Games, now part of the Diamond League in athletics. Marienlyst is used as a football stadium, and hosts both Strømsgodset IF and the Norway national under-21 football team. Lillestrøm, Dælenenga and Kadettangen are only used for lower-level football, as they lack any significant spectator stands. Jordal Amfi received a roof in 1972 and hosted the World Ice Hockey Championships in 1958 and 1999. Holmenkollbakken has been rebuilt several times since the Olympics; most recently it was entirely rebuilt in 2010. The complex has received a ski stadium, collectively known as Holmenkollen National Arena. In addition to the annual Holmenkollen Ski Festival, the hill hosted the FIS Nordic World Ski Championships in 1930, 1966, 1982 and 2011.

References

Bibliography
 
 
 

 
1952 Winter Olympics venues
Winter Olympics 1952